Barrister Jan Muhammad Junejo (Urdu:جان محمد جونيجو, title: Raees-Ul-Muhajireen: رۂيس المھاجرين) was born in 1886 in Larkana, Sindh. He was a leader of the Khilafat Movement and took active part in their struggle against the British Raj. He died soon after February 1921.

Barrister Junejo was a landlord and a politician from Larkana who took part in the Khilafat Movement at a young age. A large number of migrants, estimated to be around 25 thousand in number, left for Peshawar under Barrister Junejo as part of the Khilafat Movement. Attempts aimed at stopping them did not succeed. The rail fare of the entire caravan amounting to thousands of rupees was paid by Barrister Junejo from his own pocket. Wherever the train stopped, the local people turned out to welcome the thousands of muhajireens who were garlanded and showered with gifts and money. Speeches were recited in their honour at the Wazirabad Junction and some people began to cry in response to such overtures. Barrister Junejo stopped them from doing so saying that it was not an occasion for crying but time for action. He told them that they are going to Kabul not to eat grapes or pomegranates of Kandahar but to save Islam.

References 
 

Leaders of the Pakistan Movement
Indian independence activists from Pakistan
Sindhi people
Philanthropists from Sindh
Scholars from Sindh
1886 births
1921 deaths
20th-century philanthropists